Sergio Chiesa (born 7 September 1972) is an Italian former long-distance runner who competed in marathons and half marathons.

Career
He was the gold medallist in the marathon at the 2001 Mediterranean Games. He represented his country at the 2003 IAAF World Half Marathon Championships, placing 35th. He also competed at the European Athletics Championships in 2002 and the 2000 World Mountain Running Championships.

On the road running circuit he won the 1998 Bergamo Marathon, 1999 Reggio Emilia Marathon, the 2006 Verona Half Marathon. He set his marathon best of 2:10:30 in 2001 at the Milan Marathon, finishing fifth.

International competitions

References

External links
 

Living people
1972 births
Italian male long-distance runners
Italian male marathon runners
Mediterranean Games gold medalists for Italy
Athletes (track and field) at the 2001 Mediterranean Games
Mediterranean Games medalists in athletics